is a Japanese voice actor affiliated with Ken Production. Some of his notable roles include Saybil in The Dawn of the Witch, Izumi in Shikimori's Not Just a Cutie, and Akira Tendo in Zom 100: Bucket List of the Dead. In 2023, he was a recipient of the Best New Actor Award at the 17th Seiyu Awards.

Filmography

Television animation
2018
 Banana Fish as Fellow

2019
 Chihayafuru 3 as Attendant

2021
 Mazica Party as Student, wizard
 The World Ends with You: The Animation as Makoto
 Tropical-Rouge! Pretty Cure as Horticulture club member
 The Aquatope on White Sand as Guest

2022
 The Dawn of the Witch as Saybil
 Shikimori's Not Just a Cutie as Izumi
 Utawarerumono: Mask of Truth as Ravie
 Megaton Musashi 2nd Season as Zaskar Dyne

2023
 My Life as Inukai-san's Dog as Pochita
 Yu-Gi-Oh! Go Rush!! as Schubach
 Why Raeliana Ended Up at the Duke's Mansion as Adam Taylor
 Zom 100: Bucket List of the Dead as Akira Tendo

Anime films
2019
 Kabaneri of the Iron Fortress: The Battle of Unato as Kabane

Original net animation
2019
 Blade of the Immortal as Makoto

Video games
2019
 Readyyy! as Aki Takachiho
 Kazura Uta as Yū Haiji

2020
 Realive! Teito Kagura Butai as Kōya Futaba
 Final Fantasy VII Remake as Chadley
 Hero Cantare as King Dark

2022
 Star Melody Yumemi Dreamer as Kanato Kamio

References

External links
 Official agency profile 
 

Japanese male video game actors
Japanese male voice actors
Ken Production voice actors
Living people
Male voice actors from Chiba Prefecture
Seiyu Award winners
Year of birth missing (living people)